Stattler is a surname. Notable people with the surname include:

Benedict Stattler (1728–1797), German Jesuit theologian
Wojciech Stattler (1800–1875), Polish painter

See also
Sattler